The 14th General Assembly of Prince Edward Island represented the colony of Prince Edward Island between January 26, 1835, and 1839.

The Assembly sat at the pleasure of the Governor of Prince Edward Island, Aretas William Young.  George Dalrymple was elected speaker.

Members

The members of the Prince Edward Island Legislature after the general election of 1835 were:

External links 
 Journal of the House of Assembly of Prince Edward Island (1835)

Terms of the General Assembly of Prince Edward Island
1835 establishments in Prince Edward Island
1839 disestablishments in Prince Edward Island